List of the strongholds or dar al-hijra of the Nizari Ismaili state in Persia (Iran) and Syria.

Most of the Persian Ismaili castles were in the Alborz mountains, in the regions of Daylaman (particularly, in Alamut and Rudbar; north of modern-day Qazvin) and Quhistan (south of Khurasan), as well as in Qumis. Most of the Syrian Ismaili castles were in Jabal Bahra' (Syrian Coastal Mountain Range).

According to Juzjani, before the Mongol invasion the Nizaris possessed 70 forts in Quhistan and 35 in Alamut. Overall, they probably had 250 castles.

The Ismaili fortresses in Rudbar of Alamut had been built on rocky heights and were equipped to withstand long sieges; they had storehouses with high capacities and elaborate water supply infrastructure such as cisterns, qanats, and canals.

Persia

Syria

The strongholds in Jabal Bahra' were known as the "Castles of the da'wa" ( qilāʿ al-daʿwah).

See also
Nizari Ismaili state
History of Nizari Ismailism
List of castles in Iran
List of castles in Syria
List of Crusader castles
Baltit Fort, used by Ismailis of the Hunza princely state in Pakistan
Muhammad I Tapar's anti-Nizari campaign
Mongol campaign against the Nizaris

References

«دانشنامهٔ تاریخ معماری و شهرسازی ایران‌شهر»، وزارت راه و شهرسازی (in Persian)

Further reading

External links

"Nizari Ismaili Concept of Castles", The Institute of Ismaili Studies

 
Nizari Ismaili state
Lists of castles in the Middle East
Castles in Syria
Castles in Iran
Iran–Syria relations
Syria history-related lists
Iran history-related lists
Isma'ilism-related lists